Peravurani railway station is a railway station serving the town of Peravurani in Tamil Nadu, India.

Background
The railway station is located just within the town. It was connected to  towards north and  towards south. The station was initially built with metre-gauge infrastructure and had three passenger services daily with one express and two passenger trains.

Lines
Presently, the station is devoid of any passenger services due to gauge conversion in the  stretch between Mayiladuthurai–Tiruvarur–Karaikudi segment to be executed at cost of  sanctioned in 2007–2008, but the conversion work progresses very slowly.peravurani railway station building construction going on

References

External links
 

Trichy railway division
Railway stations in Thanjavur district